Mount Snow (previously known as Mount Pisgah) is a mountain and ski resort in southern Vermont located in the Green Mountains.  It is Vermont's southernmost big mountain, and therefore, closest to many Northeast metropolitan areas.

In September 2019, Mount Snow joined Vail Resorts' portfolio of 37 resorts and its Epic Pass, along with all other 16 resorts owned by Peak Resorts

Mount Snow is home to Carinthia Parks, which debuted in the 2008–2009 season. Carinthia is home to ten terrain parks, with both natural and man-made features and a superpipe. Mount Snow was co-host of the first Extreme Games in 1995 and host of the X Games in 2000 and 2001. Carinthia at Mount Snow claimed home to the second stop of the first annual winter Dew Tour as well as many other events including the Freeski Open and Carinthia Classic.

In the summer of 2011, Mount Snow installed a brand new Leitner-Poma high-speed detachable six-pack bubble chair. This lift transports skiers to the top of the mountain in seven minutes. The bubble shields skiers and riders from wind and snow and keeps them warm. If it is a warm skiing day riders can choose to leave the bubble up. As of 2022, Mount Snow has two high-speed detachable lifts from the base to the 3600-foot summit and a total of six high-speed detachable chairlifts, one leaving from the Carinthia Base Area, one leaving from the Sunbrook base area and four leaving from the Main Base Area.

Statistics
Summit Elevation: 

Vertical Drop: 

Skiable area: 

Annual Average Snowfall: 158 inches

Trails: 86

Lifts: 19: 1 High-Speed Six-Pack Bubble, 1 High-Speed Six-Pack, 4 High-Speed Quads, 5 Triples, 2 Doubles, 5 Conveyors, 1 Rope Tow

Snowmaking: 83%

Total Snowguns: 917, of which 250 are fan guns. Mount Snow has the most fan guns of any resort in North America.

Terrain Park Acres: 100

Gladed Tree Acreage: 124

Tubing: Yes

Night Skiing: No

History
Mount Pisgah is the mountain that is known by many as Mount Snow and was originally named after the Biblical Mount Pisgah. A large amount of land on Mount Pisgah was purchased from the estate of Reuben Snow, in early 1953 and on December 12, 1954, the mountain, renamed Mount Snow, after the Snow family, opened to the public.   Entrepreneur Walt Schoenknecht owned the ski resort for many years and led its development into one of the largest ski areas in the country at the time.

In 1986, the Carinthia ski area was purchased and connected to the Mount Snow Trails.  Five years later, nearby Haystack Mountain Ski Area was purchased and subsequently marketed as being part of Mount Snow.  Haystack was sold and closed in 2005.

In 1992, the first snowboard park in the East was established at Mount Snow, named Un Blanco Gulch.  The park featured jumps, a half-pipe, quarter hits, spines, wedges, banked turns, and a buried van. The park was built by Tyler Doucette under the supervision of 
Chris Bluto. "The Gulch" remained a staple of Mount Snow's freestyle terrain until the 2008–2009 season when all terrain parks were moved to the Carinthia area of the mountain where a new park also named "The Gulch" was established along with seven additional parks and a "Superpipe" referred to collectively as Carinthia Parks at Mount Snow. In 2000, Mount Snow hosted the 4th Annual Winter X-Games.   The Games returned to Mount Snow the following year.

Mount Snow's Kelly Clark, bronze medalist of 2014 Olympic Women's half-pipe, won the first American gold medal of the 2002 Winter Olympics in Salt Lake City in women's half-pipe. She is a graduate of the Mount Snow Academy and the first athlete from Mount Snow to win an Olympic gold medal. Another Mount Snow Academy graduate, Devin Logan, won the silver medal of the 2014 Winter Olympics in Sochi in the Olympic debut of slopestyle. Eliza Outtrim, who placed 6th in women's moguls, also attended MSA.

In January 2009, Mount Snow hosted the winter Dew Tour. It was the first action sports tour for winter sports and is owned and operated by Alli, the Alliance of Action Sports. Many of the top athletes in action sports from around the world participated in the Winter Dew Tour.  Athletes such as Shaun White, Hannah Teter, Tanner Hall, Andreas Wiig, Gretchen Bleiler, Simon Dumont, Sarah Burke, and Travis Rice all vied for the Dew Cup, awarded at season's end.

The resort was operated by Peak Resorts, which bought it along with Attitash, in February 2007. In July 2019, Peak Resorts announced it entered a merger agreement with Vail Resorts and closed on the deal on September 24, 2019. After that, Mount Snow joined Vail Resorts' portfolio of 37 resorts and its Epic Pass.

Lifts and trails

Trails  
Number of Trails: 86

Mount Snow is made up of four separate mountain areas: Main Face, North Face, Sunbrook, and Carinthia. The Main Face can be divided into smaller areas named after its main chairlifts. including Sundance, Ego Alley, Grand Summit, and Canyon. At the base of Main Face is the "Launch Pad", a learning area adjacent to the main base area's clock tower and ski school. There is also a learning area by the Sundance Lodge. The North Face, fittingly located to the north of Main Face, is home to some of Mount Snow's most advanced terrain, including its only double-black diamond, Ripcord. Opposite of the North Face on the southern face of the mountain, is Sunbrook which offers scenic trails. Carinthia is home to the biggest terrain park in the east; with 11 terrain parks, 125+ features, a mini-pipe and a superpipe with18-foot walls. The parks range from expert to beginner-level features.

Lift system 
Mount Snow has 19 lifts.

Main Face:

Carinthia Lifts:

North Face:

Sunbrook:

Year-round services
Mount Snow has a variety of dining and retail options. Naturespa in the Grand Summit Resort Hotel offers an array of spa services and Mount Snow has a variety of lodging properties. Mount Snow Realty is also available for buying and selling homes in and around the valley.

Recent capital projects
In the fall of 2017, Mount Snow completed a $30m snowmaking expansion and upgrade project of replacing miles of snowmaking pipe across the mountain to maximize the 645 new low-energy fan guns and built a new 120 million gallon snowmaking pond, called West Lake. The winter of 2018/2019 also saw the completion of the $22M Carinthia Base Lodge in the Carinthia Base Area, which broke ground in June 2017.

Summer operations
Mount Snow is one of the first ski resorts in the nation to offer lift service mountain biking. Mount Snow Bike Park is open for downhill mountain biking, golfing is at Mount Snow Golf Club, and hiking and scenic chairlift rides. Outdoor Exploration Camp provides kids and teens with daily activities and adventures.

See also
 Kelly Clark
 Dew Tour
 X Games

References

External links
 
 Mount Snow Area Information
 RSN Cams
 Mount Snow Winter Dew Tour Blog
 Mt. Snow - NewEnglandSkiHistory.com

Buildings and structures in Windham County, Vermont
Geography of Windham County, Vermont
Landforms of Windham County, Vermont
Snow
Peak Resorts
Ski areas and resorts in Vermont
Tourist attractions in Windham County, Vermont